B. Fred Harvey (born November 11, 1942) is a Canadian former politician. He served in the Legislative Assembly of New Brunswick from 1987 to 1993, as a Liberal member for the constituency of Carleton North.

References

New Brunswick Liberal Association MLAs
1942 births
Living people